Undoing Gender is a 2004 book by the philosopher Judith Butler.

Summary
Butler examines gender, sex, psychoanalysis and the way medicine and the law treat intersex and transgender people. Focusing on the case of David Reimer who was medically reassigned from male to female after a botched circumcision, Butler reexamines the theory of performativity that they originally explored in Gender Trouble (1990). David, then renamed as a girl- Brenda, rediscovers his masculinity and goes on to live his life as a male again. While many of Butler's books are intended for a highly academic audience, Undoing Gender reaches out to a much broader readership.

Butler discusses how gender is performed without one being conscious of it, but says that it does not mean this performativity is "automatic or mechanical". They argue that we have desires that do not originate from our personhood, but rather, from social norms. The philosopher also debates our notions of "human" and "less-than-human" and how these culturally imposed ideas can keep one from having a "viable life" as the biggest concerns are usually about whether a person will be accepted if their desires differ from normality. They state that one may feel the need of being recognized in order to live, but that at the same time, the conditions to be recognized make life "unlivable". The writer proposes an interrogation of such conditions so that people who resist them may have more possibilities of living.

See also
 Intersex
 Queer theory

References

External links
 Review – Undoing Gender
 Gender Performance and Trans-experience - Interview with Judith Butler
 Gender and Performance - Judith Butler Basics

2000s LGBT literature
2004 non-fiction books
American non-fiction books
Books by Judith Butler
English-language books
Gender studies books
Intersex in non-fiction
Postmodern feminism
Routledge books
Transgender non-fiction books
LGBT literature in the United States